ABSA Women's League is the top tier South African association football league.

History

It was launched in 2009 in order to improve the South African women's national team's international performances.

References

2009 establishments in South Africa
Professional sports leagues in South Africa
South Africa
Sports leagues established in 2009
Soccer in South Africa
Women's soccer in South Africa